is a Japanese Magic: The Gathering player. Despite never having reached the top eight of a Pro Tour, he is one of the most successful players on the Grand Prix circuit, especially on home turf. He is one of the players with the most lifetime Pro Points without a Pro Tour top eight, and is one of fourteen players to have won four or more Grand Prix.

Achievements

References

Living people
Japanese Magic: The Gathering players
Sportspeople from Osaka Prefecture
Year of birth missing (living people)
Japanese sportsmen
Place of birth missing (living people)